Worlds Apart is the third studio album by the English anarcho-punk band Subhumans. It was released shortly after the band's initial demise in 1985.

Track listing
 "33322" - 1:21
 "British Disease" - 2:40
 "Heads of State" - 2:30
 "Apathy" - 2:43
 "Fade Away" - 2:55
 "Businessman" - 2:02
 "Someone Is Lying" - 4:24
 "Pigman" - 2:32
 "Can't Hear the Words" - 1:52
 "Get to Work on Time" - 3:05
 "Carry on Laughing" - 3:15
 "Straightline Thinking" - 2:55
 "Ex-Teenage Rebel" - 4:40
 "Powergames" - 3:33
 "33322" - 1:59

References

1985 albums
Subhumans (British band) albums